Eefje Muskens (born 17 June 1989), is a Dutch badminton player who specializes in doubles. Her current partner for women's doubles is Selena Piek. She won the 2014 and 2015 editions of Dutch National Badminton Championships with Piek. In 2016, she and Piek competed at the Rio Summer Olympics and reached the quarter final round.

Achievements

European Championships
Women's Doubles

BWF Grand Prix 
The BWF Grand Prix has two level such as Grand Prix and Grand Prix Gold. It is a series of badminton tournaments, sanctioned by Badminton World Federation (BWF) since 2007.

Women's Doubles

 BWF Grand Prix Gold tournament
 BWF Grand Prix tournament

BWF International Challenge/Series
Women's doubles

 BWF International Challenge tournament
 BWF International Series tournament

References

External links

 

1989 births
Living people
People from Goirle
Sportspeople from North Brabant
Dutch female badminton players
Badminton players at the 2016 Summer Olympics
Olympic badminton players of the Netherlands
21st-century Dutch women